Henryk Piotr Wieczorek (born 14 December 1949 in Chorzów) is a Polish retired footballer. He played for a few clubs, including ROW Rybnik, Górnik Zabrze and AJ Auxerre in France. He played for the Polish national team (18 matches) and was a participant at the 1974 FIFA World Cup, where Poland won the bronze medal and at the 1976 Summer Olympics where Poland won the silver medal. Wieczorek later coached several Polish clubs.

Career statistics

International goals

References

External links
 

1949 births
Living people
Polish footballers
Poland international footballers
Polish football managers
1974 FIFA World Cup players
Footballers at the 1976 Summer Olympics
Olympic silver medalists for Poland
Olympic footballers of Poland
Górnik Zabrze players
AJ Auxerre players
Ligue 1 players
Sportspeople from Chorzów
Polish expatriate footballers
Expatriate footballers in France
Polish expatriate sportspeople in France
Ekstraklasa players
Olympic medalists in football
Polish cooperative organizers
Szombierki Bytom managers
Medalists at the 1976 Summer Olympics
Association football midfielders